Senator Elliott may refer to:

Chris Elliott (politician), Alabama State Senate
Dick Elliott (politician) (1935–2014), South Carolina State Senate
Douglas Hemphill Elliott (1921–1960), Pennsylvania State Senate
James T. Elliott (1823–1875), Arkansas State Senate
Jim Elliott (born 1942), Montana State Senate
John Elliott (Georgia politician) (1773–1827), U.S. Senator from Georgia from 1819 to 1825
Joyce Elliott (born 1951), Arkansas State Senate
Robert Elliott (Victorian politician) (1884–1950), Australian Senate for Victoria

See also
Samuel Atkins Eliot (politician) (1798–1862), Massachusetts State Senate
Thomas D. Eliot (1808–1870), Massachusetts State Senate